Henriëtte Pessers (1899-1986) was a Dutch artist who painted in the Expressionist style.

Biography 
Pessers was born on 3 January 1899 in Tilburg. She attended the Académie Royale des Beaux-Arts in Brussels. Her work was included in the 1939 exhibition and sale Onze Kunst van Heden (Our Art of Today) at the Rijksmuseum in Amsterdam. In 1941 she married P.M.C. Jansen.

Pessers died on 22 May 1986 in Heeze. Her work is in the Noordbrabants Museum and the Van Abbemuseum.

References

External links
images of Pessers' art on Invaluable

1899 births
1986 deaths
People from Tilburg
20th-century Dutch women artists